The Voice Daily is a newspaper published in Burma. Due to law changes, the paper began freely publishing from 1 April 2013. The Voice Daily is run by the publishers of The Voice Weekly, which has been published since 2004.

References

External links

2013 establishments in Myanmar
Daily newspapers published in Myanmar
Newspapers established in 2013